KQ may refer to:
 Kenya Airways (IATA airline designator)
 Kingman Reef (FIPS PUB 10-4 territory code)
 The King of Queens, a sitcom
 King's Quest, a video game series by Sierra Entertainment

See also